Miloš Čudić (born 21 August 1996) is a Serbian football midfielder who plays for OFK Žarkovo in the Serbian First League.

Club career
He has been playing with FK Rad main team since the season 2014–15. After he spent a period between 2015 and 2016 with satellite club Žarkovo, Čudić decided to leave the club at the beginning of 2017. He joined Zemun shortly after.

International career
Despite having been born in Banja Luka, Republika Srpska, Bosnia and Herzegovina, he has been playing for the Serbian U-19 team.

He was part of the Republika Srpska U-18 team in September 2013.

References

External links
 
 Miloš Čudić stats at utakmica.rs
 
 

1996 births
Living people
Sportspeople from Banja Luka
Serbs of Bosnia and Herzegovina
Association football midfielders
Serbian footballers
FK Rad players
OFK Žarkovo players
FK Zemun players
FK Borac Banja Luka players
Serbian SuperLiga players
Serbian First League players